Gornja Višnjica (Cyrillic: Горња Вишњица) is a village in the City of Zenica, Bosnia and Herzegovina.

Demographics 
According to the 2013 census, its population was 217.

References

Populated places in Zenica